Alexei Sergeyevich Vasiliev (born September 1, 1977) is a Russian former ice hockey defenseman. He played in one National Hockey League game for the New York Rangers during the 1999–00 NHL season, going scoreless and receiving two penalty minutes in a contest against the Montreal Canadiens.

Vasiliev also spent 12 seasons playing for Lokomotiv Yaroslavl in the Russian Superleague and KHL. His contract was not renewed for the 2011–12 KHL season, which saved his life as he was not in the 2011 Lokomotiv Yaroslavl plane crash that killed the majority of the team.

Career statistics

Regular season and playoffs

International

See also
 List of players who played only one game in the NHL

External links
 

1977 births
Living people
Hartford Wolf Pack players
Lokomotiv Yaroslavl players
Milwaukee Admirals (IHL) players
New York Rangers draft picks
New York Rangers players
Russian ice hockey defencemen
Sportspeople from Yaroslavl
Torpedo Nizhny Novgorod players